PartyCasino is an online casino first launched in 1997 under the name Starluck Casino before relaunching again in 2006 as a fully integrated platform. The casino offers over 500 games ranging from casino classics like Blackjack and Roulette to a wide variety of online slots.

Following the 2011 merger of Party Gaming PLC and bwin Interactive Entertainment AG, PartyCasino became one of Gaming VC Holdings PLC’s (GVC) leading casino brands. The company has four main product verticals, sports, casino, poker and bingo, as well as other core brands such as, CasinoClub, Betboo, Sportingbet, Bwin, partypoker, Foxy Bingo and Gioco Digitale.

History 

PartyCasino was originally launched as Starluck Casino by Ruth Parasol under iGlobal Media PartyCasino, it went on to become one of the first successful online casinos. Its initial success prompted the launch of PartyPoker (2001) and PartyBingo (2003), by 2005 PartyGaming was listed on the London Stock Exchange market valued at £4.64 billion enough to earn itself a spot on the FTSE100 Index.

In 2011, bwin Interactive Entertainment and PartyGaming completed their merger, creating the world’s largest listed online gaming company.

On the 1st of February 2016 GVC acquired bwin.party digital entertainment plc, the group is headquartered in the Isle of Man and has licenses in Austria, Belgium, Bulgaria, France, Italy, Denmark, Germany (Schleswig-Holstein), Spain, Malta, Denmark, UK, South Africa, and the Dutch Caribbean.

In June 2017, PartyCasino relaunched to players with an all-new look and feel. The updated design – which was the result of an ongoing collaboration between PartyCasino employees and Leeds-based advertising agency, Home – did away with the site’s previous cartoon style in favour of a more sophisticated approach, with photo-realistic imagery and lens flare lighting effects featuring prominently. As part of the rebrand, the PartyCasino logo was also updated – with the previously used lowercase font and dice graphic being ditched in favour of a more contemporary two-colour design.

In 2021, McLaren Racing announced a new multi-year partnership with Entain brands, PartyCasino and PartyPoker. The partnership was officially launched at the 2021 Monaco Grand Prix on May 23.

References

External links
Party Casino

Entain
Online casinos